Pod Gradom is a local community of the City Municipality of Celje in central-eastern Slovenia.

Local communities of the City Municipality of Celje